Gloria Richetta Jones (born October 19, 1945) is an American singer and songwriter who first found success in the United Kingdom, being recognized there as "The Queen of Northern Soul". She recorded the 1965 hit song "Tainted Love" and has worked in multiple genres as a Motown songwriter and recording artist, backing vocalist, and as a performer in musicals such as Hair. In the 1970s, she was a keyboardist and vocalist in Marc Bolan's glam rock band T. Rex. She and Bolan were also in a committed romantic relationship and had a son, Rolan Bolan (born September 26, 1975), together.

Biography

Early life and career
Jones was born in Cincinnati, Ohio, and moved to Los Angeles, California, at the age of seven, where she first started singing. Jones' first taste of fame came at the age of 14, when, while still at school, she formed with Frankie Kahrl and Billy Preston the successful gospel group the COGIC Singers, with whom she recorded the album It's a Blessing. Although she remained with the group for some four years, she soon found herself drawn into the Los Angeles pop scene.

In 1964, Jones, in her late teens, was discovered by the songwriter Ed Cobb. Signing with Cobb's Greengrass Productions, she recorded her first hit record, "Heartbeat Pts 1 & 2," which Cobb wrote and produced.

She toured the United States, performing on several American television programs, footage of which still exists. One performance occurred at a Rock and Soul show in Disneyland in the summer of 1965. "Heartbeat" became a rhythm and blues tune which was recorded later by Dusty Springfield, Spencer Davis and many other artists.

By then, Jones had recorded other songs for Uptown Records, a subsidiary of Capitol/EMI. Included among these was another Cobb-written song, "Tainted Love". So strong was Jones's following in Northern England that she was proclaimed "The Queen of Northern Soul". 

Jones also recorded an album for the Uptown label entitled Come Go with Me which was released in 1966. Jones studied piano, and acquired an advanced classical degree primarily in the works of Bach. 

In 1968, she joined the cast of Catch My Soul, a rock and soul version of the play Othello, which included cast members Jerry Lee Lewis, The Blossoms, and Dr. John. During the summer of 1968, she performed in a play called Revolution, at the Mark Taper Forum in Los Angeles. That winter, she joined the Los Angeles cast of Hair, the musical. Eventually, she was to meet Pam Sawyer, who asked her to write for Motown Records. Jones and Sawyer were amongst the second string of writers at Motown, but still wrote for such artists as Gladys Knight & the Pips, Commodores, The Four Tops and The Jackson 5. 

As Jones was also initially a singer for the label, protocol demanded a pseudonym, so for some of her co-writes she used the name LaVerne Ware (not to be confused with another Motown songwriter/producer, Leon Ware).

Songs that Jones worked on during this period include The Supremes' "Have I Lost You" (writer), Marvin Gaye and Diana Ross's "My Mistake (Was to Love You)" (writer), Junior Walker's "I Ain't Goin' Nowhere" (writer/producer) and the Four Tops' "Just Seven Numbers (Can Straighten Out My Life)" (writer). In 1970 she provided backing vocals on Ry Cooder's eponymous first album. The best-known song that Jones penned was Gladys Knight and the Pips' "If I Were Your Woman", which was nominated for a Grammy in 1971. Jones left Motown at the end of 1973, following the release of her album Share My Love.

After Motown 

Jones first met Marc Bolan of T. Rex in 1969 while performing in Hair (Los Angeles cast). While touring in Europe, Bolan and Jones met for the second time at the Speakeasy in London. In 1972, she was recommended by Warner Brothers' Bob Regehr to sing backing vocals behind T. Rex at Winterland in San Francisco.

Soon after joining T. Rex, Jones and Bolan became romantically involved. They had a son, Rolan Bolan (b. September 26, 1975). She sang backing vocals and played clavinet with T. Rex from 1973 to 1977. Her rendition of "Dock of the Bay" appears as a bonus track on T. Rex's album Bolan's Zip Gun. Jones released an album in 1976, called Vixen, which featured several songs written by Bolan, and he also was the producer for the album.

In 1977, Jones worked with the group Gonzalez, producing several of their singles, and also penning the disco hit, "Haven't Stopped Dancing Yet" for the group. She toured the UK with Gonzalez, first on the Bob Marley tour, and then with Osibisa.

She was the driver of the car, a Mini 1275 GT, that crashed near Barnes Common, striking a tree and killing Bolan at 4 a.m. on September 16, 1977, on the way back to Bolan's Richmond property. They were returning from an evening at a restaurant in Mayfair where they had both been drinking wine.  Jones was found by her brother Richard, her foot trapped beneath the clutch by the engine, while Bolan was found still in the passenger seat which had been dislodged and landed in the rear of the vehicle. Jones broke her jaw in the accident. When she was well enough to leave the hospital, she was informed that Bolan's fans had looted most of their possessions from their house. She was later scheduled to appear in court in London on charges of being unfit to drive and of driving a car in a dangerous condition. However, she left the UK with her son and returned to the US before the court date so the Coroner's Court recorded a verdict of accidental death.

After Bolan

Having lost her possessions, Jones moved with her son back to Los Angeles where they stayed with Jones' family.

In 1978, she released the album Windstorm, which she dedicated to the memory of Bolan: the back cover reads, "Special dedication in memory of my son's father, Marc Bolan, whom we miss very much." Her single "Bring on the Love" was a success on the American R&B chart.

Jones stayed in the music industry for several years after, releasing an album produced by Ed Cobb, titled Reunited in 1981. She also collaborated again with Billy Preston and other Cogic Singers for a 1984 reunion album The Cogic's. She has since worked as a musical supervisor for films.

On her 1982 album Reunited, she was proclaimed "Northern Queen of Soul".

In 2010, together with her son Rolan, she established the Marc Bolan School of Music & Film in Makeni, Sierra Leone.

Discography

Solo studio albums 
 1966 – Come Go with Me
 1973 – Share My Love
 1976 – Vixen (not released in the US)
 1978 – Windstorm
 1982 – Reunited
 1996 – Vixen / Windstorm (CD release)
 2009 – Share My Love (CD release)

With T. Rex
 1974 – Zinc Alloy and the Hidden Riders of Tomorrow
 1974 – Light of Love
 1975 – Bolan's Zip Gun
 1976 – Futuristic Dragon
 1977 – Dandy in the Underworld

With The COGIC'S
 1966 – It's a Blessing
 1984 – The COGIC'S

US solo singles

UK solo singles (selection) 
 1973 – "Tin Can People" / "So Tired"
 1976 – "Get It On (Part 1)" / "Get It On (Part 2)"
 1976 – "I Ain't Going Nowhere" / "Simplicity Blues"
 1976 – "Tainted Love" (New Version) / "Go Now" (Album Version) (12" – MAXI)
 1977 – "To Know You Is to Love You" / "City Port" (with Marc Bolan)
 1977 – "Go Now" (Single Version) / "Drive Me Crazy (Disco Lady)"
 1977 – "Bring on the Love" (Single Version) / "Cry Baby"
 1977 – "Bring on the Love" (Album Version) / "Bring on the Love" (Instrumental)
 1978 – "When I Was a Little Girl" /"When I Was a Little Girl" (Instrumental)
 1978 – "Windstorm" / "Blue Light Microphone"
 1979 – "Listen to Me" / "Father I'm Coming Home" (From the v/a Double Album Alpha Omega)

Backing vocal work
 1966 with Denny Brooks on Denny Brooks
 1966 with Gary St. Clair on Gary St. Clair
 1966 with Charles Wright & the Watts 103rd Street Rhythm Band on Music For The Times We Live In
 1968 with Neil Young on Neil Young
 1968 with Jackie DeShannon on "Put a Little Love in Your Heart"
 1969 with the Brothers and Sisters of Los Angeles on Dylan's Gospel
 Gloria sings lead on "I Shall Be Released", "Chimes of Freedom", and "I'll Be Your Baby Tonight"
 1970 with Ry Cooder on Ry Cooder
 1970 with Daniel Moore on Daniel Moore
 1971 with Jesse Davis on Jesse Davis
 1971 with Ry Cooder on Into the Purple Valley
 1971 with REO Speedwagon on REO Speedwagon
 1971 with Roy Ayers/Roy Ayers Ubiquity on He's Coming
 1971 with Alan Gerber on Alan Gerber Album
 1972 with Buffy Saint Marie on Moonshot
 1972 with Elvin Bishop on Rock My Soul
 1972 with Delaney Bramlett on Some Things Coming (Heartbeat)
 1973 with Judee Sill on Heart Food
 1973 with Little Feat on Dixie Chicken
 1973 with John Kay on My Sportin' Life
 1973 with Maria Muldaur on Maria Muldaur
 1973 with Joe Cocker on Joe Cocker
 1973 with Eddie Floyd on Soul Street
 1973 with REO Speedwagon on Ridin' the Storm Out
 1974 with Michael Edward Campbell on Michael Edward Campbell
 1974 with The Commodores on Machine Gun
 1975 with Michael Masser on The Original Soundtrack of Mahogany
 1975 with Harry Nilsson on Duit on Mon Dei
 1977 with Billy Preston on Whole New Thing
 1977 with T. Rex on Dandy in the Underworld
 1978 with Steve Harley on Hobo With a Grin
 1979 with Billy Preston on Late at Night 
 1980 with Lonnie Liston Smith on Love is the Answer

Songwriting and production

Filmography

See also
List of disco artists (F-K)

References

Bibliography

External links 
 Jones and Bolan, 5th photo

1945 births
Living people
African-American rock musicians
American expatriates in Sierra Leone
American expatriates in England
Motown artists
Record producers from Ohio
Musicians from Cincinnati
Northern soul musicians
T. Rex (band) members
American women record producers
African-American women singer-songwriters
20th-century African-American women singers
Singer-songwriters from Ohio